P. Benjamin is an Indian politician in Assembly of Tamil Nadu 15th Tamil Nadu Legislative Assembly. He was elected from the Maduravoyal constituency as a candidate of the AIADMK.

Jayalalithaa appointed Benjamin as Minister for School Education in May 2016. This was his first cabinet post in the Government of Tamil Nadu.

Electoral performance

References 

Tamil Nadu MLAs 2016–2021
State cabinet ministers of Tamil Nadu
All India Anna Dravida Munnetra Kazhagam politicians
Year of birth missing (living people)
Living people
Tamil Nadu politicians